Per Johan Gabriel Wikström (born 21 February 1985) is a Swedish politician of the Social Democrats. He served as Minister for Public Health, Healthcare and Sports in the Swedish Government from 2014 to 2017. On 5 May 2017, Wikström announced he will be on sick leave due symptoms related  to burnout. Annika Strandhäll served acting Minister for Public Health, Healthcare and Sports during his sick leave, and on 27 July 2017 he resigned from his position.

Wikström started his career in the Swedish Social Democratic Youth League in Västmanland County in 2006. He was a member of the national executive board of the youth league from 2007 to 2011 and national chairman from 2011 until being appointed cabinet minister in 2014.

As national chairman, Wikström confronted the Social Democrats leadership by pushing a proposal of a 90-day warranty for young unemployed people through the Social Democrats Congress in 2013. The proposal was rejected by the party leadership, but gained hearing by the Congress delegates and is now one of the Löfven cabinet's key reforms since taking office in 2014, although it has not been implemented or announced yet (as of August 2016).

In March 2017, Wikström participated in the first ever gathering of the Party of European Socialists’ health ministers, chaired by Jevgeni Ossinovski.

References 

|-

1985 births
Living people
Swedish Social Democratic Party politicians
Swedish Ministers for Health